Busseola is a genus of moths of the family Noctuidae described by Friedrich Thurau in 1904.

Species
 Busseola convexilimba Strand, 1912
 Busseola fusca (Fuller, 1901)
 Busseola fuscantis Hampson, 1918
 Busseola hirsuta Boursin, 1954
 Busseola longistriga (Draudt, 1950)
 Busseola mesophaea Hampson, 1914
 Busseola obliquifascia (Hampson, 1909)
 Busseola pallidicosta (Hampson, 1902)
 Busseola phaia Bowden, 1956
 Busseola praepallens (Hampson, 1910)
 Busseola quadrata Bowden, 1956
 Busseola rufidorsata Hampson, 1914
 Busseola sacchariphaga T. B. Fletcher, 1928
 Busseola segeta Bowden, 1956
 Busseola submarginalis (Hampson, 1891)

References
 
 

Hadeninae